Pseudocoremia is a genus of moths in the family Geometridae erected by Arthur Gardiner Butler in 1877. This genus is endemic to New Zealand.

Species include:
 Pseudocoremia albafasciata Philpott, 1915
 Pseudocoremia amaculata Stephens & Gibbs, 2003
Pseudocoremia berylia Howes, 1943
 Pseudocoremia campbelli Philpott, 1927
 Pseudocoremia cineracia Howes, 1942
 Pseudocoremia colpogramma Meyrick, 1936
 Pseudocoremia dugdalei Stephens & Gibbs, 2003
 Pseudocoremia fascialata Philpott, 1903
 Pseudocoremia fenerata Felder & Rogenhofer, 1875
 Pseudocoremia flava Warren, 1896
 Pseudocoremia fluminea Philpott, 1926
 Pseudocoremia hudsoni Stephens, Gibbs & Patrick, 2007
 Pseudocoremia insignita Philpott, 1930
 Pseudocoremia lactiflua Meyrick, 1912
 Pseudocoremia leucelaea (Meyrick, 1909)
 Pseudocoremia lupinata Felder & Rogenhofer, 1875
 Pseudocoremia lutea (Philpott, 1914)
 Pseudocoremia melinata Felder & Rogenhofer, 1874
 Pseudocoremia modica Philpott, 1921
 Pseudocoremia monacha Hudson, 1903
 Pseudocoremia ombrodes Meyrick, 1902
Pseudocoremia pergrata (Philpott, 1930)
 Pseudocoremia productata Walker, 1862
 Pseudocoremia rudisata Walker, 1862
 Pseudocoremia suavis Butler, 1879 – common forest looper
 Pseudocoremia terrena Philpott, 1915

References

Boarmiini